KOAC (550 AM) is a radio station licensed to Corvallis, Oregon. The station is owned by Oregon Public Broadcasting, and airs OPBs news and talk programming, consisting of syndicated programming from NPR, APM and PRI, as well as locally produced offerings.

Due to its transmitter power and location near the bottom of the AM dial, KOAC's covers most of Oregon's densely populated area during the day, providing at least secondary coverage from Portland to Roseburg. It is the only directional AM radio station in the United States which uses a shunt-fed antenna.

History

KOAC is one of the oldest radio stations of its kind. It was first licensed, with the sequentially assigned call letters KFDJ, to the Oregon Agricultural College (forerunner of Oregon State University) on December 7, 1922, and made its debut broadcast on January 23, 1923. It became KOAC in late 1925. The station was one of a number of AM stations signed on by universities in the early days of radio. Unlike most of its contemporaries, KOAC was eventually able to have a frequency to itself full-time.

In 1932, the station was transferred from what was by then Oregon State Agricultural College to the Oregon State Board of Higher Education's General Extension Division. Starting in the 1950s, the board signed on a number of satellite radio stations, as well as a sister network of television stations fronted by KOAC-TV (channel 7, which signed on in 1957). This group became known as Oregon Educational Broadcasting, which evolved into the Oregon Educational and Public Broadcasting Service in 1971 and became today's Oregon Public Broadcasting in 1981. KOAC-AM-TV served as the flagship stations until 1981, when the network was spun off from the Board of Higher Education and became a separate state agency. At that time, its Portland-based satellites, KOAP-FM-TV (now KOPB-FM-TV) became the flagships.

References

External links
FCC History Cards for KOAC
opb.org

OAC (AM)
OAC
NPR member stations
Corvallis, Oregon
Radio stations established in 1922
1922 establishments in Oregon
Radio stations licensed before 1923 and still broadcasting